The Premio Mario Incisa della Rocchetta is a Listed flat horse race in Italy open to three-year-old thoroughbred fillies. It is run at Milan over a distance of 2,000 metres (about 1¼ miles), and it is scheduled to take place each year in June.

History
The event was originally called the Premio Legnano, and for a period it held Group 2 status. It was formerly open to fillies and mares aged three or older.

The Premio Legnano was subtitled the Memorial Mario Incisa della Rocchetta after the prominent racehorse owner's death in 1983. It was downgraded to Group 3 level in the late 1980s.

The race was cut from 2,000 to 1,600 metres in 1995. It was extended to 2,400 metres in 1997. It became known as the Premio Mario Incisa in the early 2000s, and during this period it was held in June.

The event was shortened to 2,000 metres and restricted to three-year-old fillies in 2005. From this point it was staged in late May, and usually titled the Premio Mario Incisa della Rocchetta. It was switched to late June in 2009. In 2015 it was move to a date in early May and downgraded to Listed status.

Records
Most successful horse since 1978 (2 wins):
 Lara's Idea – 1991, 1992

Leading jockey since 1988 (3 wins):
 Gabriele Bietolini – Bemont Track (1996), Ellenica (1998), Kardthea (2002)

Leading trainer since 1988 (3 wins):
 Bruno Grizzetti – Kardthea (2002), Troppo Oca (2005), Rosa del Dubai (2008)
 Stefano Botti - Fasciascura (2012), Licia (2013), So Many Shots (2014)

Winners since 1988

Earlier winners

 1978: Azzurrina
 1979: Quadrupler
 1980: Nebbia sul Bradano
 1981: Rattling Wind
 1982: Corita
 1983: Angela Serra
 1984: Vers la Caisse
 1985: Easy to Copy
 1986: High Competence
 1987: Russian Lady

See also
 List of Italian flat horse races

References

 Racing Post:
 
 galopp-sieger.de – Premio Mario Incisa della Rocchetta (ex Premio Legnano).
 horseracingintfed.com – International Federation of Horseracing Authorities – Race Detail (2012).
 pedigreequery.com – Premio Mario Incisa della Rocchetta – Milano San Siro.

Flat horse races for three-year-old fillies
Horse races in Italy
Sport in Milan